Sharie De Castro (born 31 December 1991) is a Virgin Islander beauty pageant titleholder and politician. She was crowned Miss British Virgin Islands 2012 and represented the British Virgin Islands in the 2013 Miss Universe pageant. She is an At-large representative for the House of Assembly of the British Virgin Islands, a position that she has held since the 2019 general election. She is the current Minister for Education, Culture, Youth Affairs, Fisheries and Agriculture.

Early life
Sharie is a graduate of Texas Christian University. She's a member of Delta Sigma Theta sorority. She was employed at Elmore Stoutt High School.

Pageant career
The finals of Miss British Virgin Islands 2012 held at Multi Purpose Sports Complex in Road Town on 5 August
2012. As well as the title, she also won Miss Congeniality, People's Choice, Miss Poise, Best BVI Promotion, Best Talent, Best Interview (prelim) and Miss Intellect (composed of Best Introduction, Question and Answer and Pre-done interview).

The final of the 8th Annual Miss Caribbean World 2013 was held at Multi Purpose Sports Complex in Road Town on 4 May 2013. As well as the title, she also won Miss Poise, Best Talent, Best Evening Wear and Miss Intellect and tied with Miss Dominica in the Best Swimwear category.

References

External links
 Official Miss British Virgin Islands website

1991 births
British Virgin Islands beauty pageant winners
Living people
Texas Christian University alumni
Miss Universe 2013 contestants
Members of the House of Assembly of the British Virgin Islands
British Virgin Islands women in politics
Government ministers of the British Virgin Islands
Women government ministers of the British Virgin Islands
21st-century politicians
21st-century women politicians
People from Road Town